The Handley Page H.P.39 is a wooden biplane that was constructed in 1929. The aircraft was intended to compete in a competition proposed by the Daniel Guggenheim Fund for the Promotion of Aeronautics - the Guggenheim Safe Aircraft Competition. The original working name for the aircraft was the Guggenheim Competition Biplane. The name Gugnunc was at first unofficial, coming from the Pip, Squeak and Wilfred newspaper cartoon (in the Daily Mirror and later in silent films), but it later became official.

Construction and operation
Only one example of the type was constructed, and it was allotted civil registration G-AACN. 
It used slots and flaps to achieve the necessary low speed and short takeoff and landing distances for the various Guggenheim prizes.

The aircraft competed in the competition in 1929. Most of the competitors failed to enter due to mechanical problems or failure to satisfy the organizers' safety checks. The Gugnunc performed adequately but did not win any prizes.

While at the competition, the Handley Page team noticed that the Curtiss competitors were using an unlicensed version of the Handley Page slot. In the following legal battles, the Curtiss lawyers brought up a postwar judgement that foreign aircraft (and particularly Handley Page aircraft) were prohibited from being imported into the US.

On return to the UK, the aircraft continued experimental flying, was ultimately purchased by the Air Ministry, given registration K1908, and was allocated to the Royal Aircraft Establishment for further testing. The aircraft was struck off in 1934 and presented to the Science Museum. In 2016 it was installed as the centrepiece of the Winton Gallery of the museum. The curved overhead structure and layout of the gallery, designed by Dame Zaha Hadid represents the airflow around the aircraft.

Specifications (H.P.39)

See also

References

Notes

Bibliography

 Barnes, C. H. Handley Page Aircraft Since 1907. London: Putnam & Company, Ltd., 1987. .
 Clayton, Donald C. Handley Page, an Aircraft Album. Shepperton, Surrey, UK: Ian Allan Ltd., 1969. .
Flight 1930 HANDLEY PAGE TYPE 39 Guggenheim Competition Machine

External links

 Science Museum (includes a picture of the aircraft)
 HP Gugnunc
Mathematics And Aviation: The Handley Page ‘Gugnunc’ 6 December 2018</ref>

1920s British experimental aircraft
1920s British civil utility aircraft
Gugnunc
Sesquiplanes
Single-engined tractor aircraft
Aircraft first flown in 1929